William Bennett (born 1943) is an American conservative pundit, political theorist and former Secretary of Education.

William, Bill, or Billy Bennett may also refer to:

Academia 
William Bennett (headmaster), teacher and teachers' representative in South Australia
W. E. Bennett (William E. Bennett), American academic
William G. Bennett (architect) (1896–1977), Australian architect
Sir William H. Bennett (surgeon) (1852–1931), British surgeon
William R. Bennett Jr. (1930–2008), American physicist
William W. Bennett (educator) (1821–1887), American president of Randolph–Macon College from 1877 to 1887

Music
William Bennett (flautist) (1936–2022), British flute player
William Bennet (musician) (c. 17671833), English musician
William Bennett (oboist) (1956–2013), San Francisco Symphony oboist
William Sterndale Bennett (1816–1875), British composer
Willie P. Bennett (1951–2008), Canadian folk music singer-songwriter
William Bennett, British experimental musician and founding member of Whitehouse and Cut Hands

Politics
W. A. C. Bennett (1900–1979), premier of British Columbia
William Bennett (Australian politician) (1843–1929), member of the Tasmanian Parliament
William Bennett (English politician) (1873–1937), Member of Parliament for Battersea South, 1929–1931
William Gordon Bennett (1900–1982), Unionist Party (Scotland) MP for Glasgow Woodside, 1950–1955
William Humphrey Bennett (1859–1925), Canadian senator
William M. Bennett (1869–1930), New York politician
William Weaver Bennett (1841–1912), mayor of Teaneck, New Jersey, 1895–1907
Bill Bennett (1932–2015), premier of British Columbia and son of W. A. C Bennett
Bill Bennett (Liberal MLA) (born 1950), British Columbia politician

Religion
William Bennet (bishop) (1746–1820), spelled Bennett on his memorial in Cloyne Cathedral
William Bennett (clergyman) (–1857), British-born Methodist minister
W. J. E. Bennett (1804–1886), Anglican priest
William H. Bennett (Mormon) (1910–1980), Canadian agronomist and leader in The Church of Jesus Christ of Latter-day Saints

Sports

Association football

William Bennett (footballer) (1896–?), English footballer with Nelson
William Bennett (football manager), Cuban football manager
Billy Bennett (footballer, born 1872) (1872–?), English footballer who played for Crewe Alexandra and Small Heath
Billy Bennett (footballer, born 1955), Scottish footballer

Other sports
William Bennett (cricketer) (1807–1886), English cricketer
Bill Bennett (footballer) (born 1948), former Australian rules footballer
Bill Bennett (ice hockey) (born 1953), American former ice hockey left winger

Others
William Bennett (Australian engineer) (1824–1889), (William Christopher Bennett) Irish-Australian surveyor and engineer
William Bennett (painter) (1811–1871), English watercolour painter
William Cox Bennett (1820–1895), English poet
William G. Bennett (gaming executive) (1924–2002), American gaming executive and real estate developer
William H. Bennett (newspaperman) (1879–1939), newspaper editor and proprietor in Peterborough, South Australia
William James Bennett (1787–1844), English watercolour painter
William Mineard Bennett (1778–1858), English miniature-painter
William Tapley Bennett Jr. (1917–1994), American diplomat
Bill Bennett (director) (born 1953), Australian film director
Billy Bennett (comedian) (1887–1942), British comedian

See also
Billie Bennett (1874–1951), American actress
William Hart-Bennett (1861–1918), British government official who served overseas
William Bennet (disambiguation)
William Benet (disambiguation)
Bennett (name)